Carleton-Victoria is a provincial electoral district for the Legislative Assembly of New Brunswick, Canada. It was first contested in the 2014 general election, having been created in the 2013 redistribution of electoral boundaries by combining portions of the Carleton and Victoria-Tobique electoral districts.

The district includes the northern parts of Carleton County and the southern and eastern parts of Victoria County.

Members of the Legislative Assembly

Election results

External links 
Website of the Legislative Assembly of New Brunswick
Map of riding as of 2018

References

New Brunswick provincial electoral districts